James Morrissey is a public relations consultant whose clients include Denis O'Brien, Atlantic Philanthropies, John McColgan and Moya Doherty.

A native of Kiltimagh, Co. Mayo, he was educated at St. Joseph's College, Garbally Park, Co. Galway and University College, Dubin. He was a music journalist with Spotlight magazine before joining Independent Newspapers.

He co-founded The Sunday Business Post in 1989 with Frank Fitzgibbon, Damien Kiberd and Aileen O’Toole.

He is a director of several companies including Newstalk, Crannog Books and Claddagh Records.

His latest book The Bee’s Knees is published by Currach Press. His previous books include Omey, Inishbofin and Inishark, The Fastnet Lighthouse, On the Verge of Want (Crannog Books) and Hot Whiskey (The Kerryman).

References

Year of birth missing (living people)
Living people
Irish public relations people
People from County Mayo